(Tokyo University of Economics) is a private university in Tokyo, Japan.

Overview 
It has campuses at the cities of Kokubunji and Musashimurayama. The predecessor of the school (Ōkura Shōgyō Gakkō) was founded in 1900 by the entrepreneur Okura Kihachiro, and it was chartered as a university in 1949.

Academic Rankings
THE JAPAN RANKING 150

The Best Listing Officer Ranking 40

References

External links

 Official website

Educational institutions established in 1900
Private universities and colleges in Japan
Universities and colleges in Tokyo
1900 establishments in Japan
Kokubunji, Tokyo
Musashimurayama, Tokyo